The Delaware Fightin' Blue Hens men's lacrosse team represents the University of Delaware in NCAA Division I men's college lacrosse. Delaware currently competes as a member of the Colonial Athletic Association (CAA) and plays its home games at Delaware Stadium in Newark, Delaware.

History
Head coach Bob Shillinglaw led the Blue Hens for over 30 years and is only the second man to coach 500 lacrosse games.

In 2007, Delaware was ranked 15th in the country heading into the 2007 NCAA tournament.  The team had won seven games in a row and the CAA tournament.  Delaware advanced to the semifinals (Final Four), defeating #2 Virginia before losing to Johns Hopkins 8–3.  It marked the team's only NCAA Final Four.

In the program's history, Delaware has produced several notable players, including NCAA Player of the Year John Grant, Jr. among the world's best lacrosse players, Anthony DiMarzo among the all-time leaders in Division I career assists, Jordan Hall of the Major League Lacrosse Rochester Rattlers, Matt Alrich, Chris Collins, Keevin Galbraith, and Curtis Dickson.

Season Results
The following is a list of Delaware's results by season as an NCAA Division I program:

{| class="wikitable"

|- align="center"

†NCAA canceled 2020 collegiate activities due to the COVID-19 virus.

See also
NCAA Men's Lacrosse Championship (1971–  )
Wingate Memorial Trophy (1934–1970)

References

External links
 

 
1948 establishments in Delaware
Lacrosse clubs established in 1948
College men's lacrosse teams in the United States